Palais Eskeles is a palace in Vienna, Austria. 

It was owned by the Jewish noble Eskeles family. Today it houses the Jewish Museum Vienna.

External links

 Jewish Museum of Vienna | Palais Eskeles

Eskeles